Serving the Servant: Remembering Kurt Cobain is a book by Danny Goldberg, former music manager of Nirvana, and current president and owner of Gold Mountain Entertainment. It was published in April 2019, on the 25th anniversary of Cobain's suicide.

Release

The book was announced in July 2018, and was released April 2nd, 2019, around the 25th anniversary of Kurt Cobain's death. It was published by Ecco Press. In May 2019, Goldberg held an "Ask Me Anything" Session to promote the book, on Reddit. The book is named after the Nirvana song "Serve the Servants" which is the first track on the band's 1993 album, In Utero.

Reception
The book was well-received. Rolling Stone writer Angie Martoccio stated of the book "[Goldberg] added a fascinating perspective to one of rock’s most harrowing stories, one that will certainly enhance the late icon’s legacy."
Gillian Gaar, for bookandfilmglobe.com, wrote that "The pain he feels over Cobain’s death still lingers, and he writes of still wondering if there’s something he could’ve said or done that might have made a difference. But while Goldberg’s feelings of loss run deep throughout the story, Serving the Servant never hesitates to accentuate the positive".

References

2019 non-fiction books
Cultural depictions of Kurt Cobain
Works about music and musicians
Ecco Press books